Purdy may refer to:

People

Surname
Al Purdy (1918–2000), Canadian poet
Amy Purdy (born 1979), American actress, model and Paralympic snowboarder
 Ashley Purdy, Black Veil Brides bassist
Bill Purdy (born 1946), American rower
Brock Purdy (born 1999), American football player
Cecil Purdy (1906–1979), Australian chess player
Charlie Purdy (1905–1982), New Zealand boxer
Debbie Purdy (1963–2014), British music journalist, political activist and right-to-die patient
Frederick Warren Purdy (1911–1942), US Navy World War II officer
George B. Purdy, American mathematician and computer scientist
Gordon Purdy (1888–1972), Canadian politician
Hamish Purdy, Canadian art director and set decorator
Helen Purdy Beale, born Helen Alice Purdy (1893–1976), US virologist
Henry Purdy (cricketer) (1883–1943), English cricketer
Henry Purdy (politician) (c. 1744–1827), landowner, judge and political figure in Nova Scotia
Henry Purdy (rugby union) (born 1994), English rugby player
James Purdy (1914–2009), American novelist, poet and playwright
Jedediah Purdy (born 1974), American law professor
Joe Purdy, American folk singer-songwriter
John Purdy (chess player) (1935–2011), Australian chess champion
John Purdy (cricketer) (1871–1938), English cricketer
John Purdy (hydrographer) (1773–1843), English compiler of naval charts
John Smith Purdy (1872–1936) public health expert and military physician associated with Australia
Kate Purdy, American television writer and producer
Ken Purdy (1913–1972), American automotive writer and editor
Kym Purdy, Australian slalom canoeist
Margaret Purdy (born 1995), Canadian pair ice skater
G. Michael Purdy, British geophysicist and oceanographer
Mike Purdy (1892–1950), American football player and coach
Milton D. Purdy (1866–1937), American lawyer, US Attorney for Minnesota (1901–1902)
Patrick Purdy (1964–1989), American perpetrator of the Stockton schoolyard shooting, killing five schoolchildren
Pid Purdy (1904–1951), American baseball and football player
Samuel Purdy (1819–1882), third Lieutenant Governor of California
Steve Purdy (born 1985), American-born Salvadoran footballer
Ted Purdy (born 1973), American golfer
William Purdy (born 1940), Canadian politician

Given name
 Purdy Crawford (1931–2014), Canadian lawyer and businessman

Places

In the United States
 Purdy, Kentucky, an unincorporated community
 Purdy Township, Barry County, Missouri
 Purdy, Missouri, a city
 Purdy, Oklahoma, an unincorporated community
 Purdy, Tennessee, an unincorporated community
 Purdy, Virginia, an unincorporated community
 Purdy, Washington, an unincorporated community and census-designated place
 Purdy, West Virginia, an unincorporated community
 Purdy, Wisconsin, an unincorporated community

Elsewhere
 Purdy, a community in Hastings Highlands, Ontario, Canada
 Purdy Islands, Papua New Guinea

Other uses
 , a US Navy destroyer that saw service in World War II
 Purdy's Chocolates, known as "Purdy's", Canadian chocolatier, confectionery manufacturer and retail operator

See also
 Purdy's Wharf, Halifax, Nova Scotia, Canada
 Purdey (disambiguation)
 Purdie, surname